Maxime Zianveni (born 29 December 1979) is a French-born Central African professional basketball coach and former player, who played at the power forward position. He is assistant coach for SLUC Nancy Basket of the LNB Pro A and also current head coach of the Central African Republic national basketball team. He played for several clubs in France during his playing career.

Coaching career
On 23 April 2020, Zianveni signed as head coach of Le Cannet of the Nationale Masculine 2 (NM2), France's fourth tier league.

He became the head coach of the Central African Republic national basketball team in 2021, and coached the country at FIBA AfroBasket 2021.

On July 6, 2022, he has signed with SLUC Nancy Basket of the LNB Pro A as an assistant coach.

References

1979 births
Living people
AEL Limassol B.C. players
APOEL B.C. players
Boulazac Basket Dordogne players
Central African Republic men's basketball players
Central African Republic basketball coaches
Citizens of the Central African Republic through descent
Élan Chalon players
Étoile Charleville-Mézières players
French men's basketball players
French sportspeople of Central African Republic descent
HTV Basket players
Power forwards (basketball)
SIG Basket players
SLUC Nancy Basket players
Sportspeople from Nancy, France
STB Le Havre players